Cimiano is a station on Line 2 of the Milan Metro. The station is located near the junction between Via Palmanova, Viale Don Luigi Orione, Via Don Giovanni Calabria and Via Pusiano, in the district of Cimiano. The station was opened on 27 September 1969 as part of the inaugural section of Line 2, between Cascina Gobba and Caiazzo.

It is a surface station with a single island platform and has no access for people with physical disabilities.

References

External links

Line 2 (Milan Metro) stations
Railway stations opened in 1968
1968 establishments in Italy
Railway stations in Italy opened in the 20th century